Sandhills or Sand Hills may refer to:

 Sandhill

Canada
 Sand Hills, Ontario, near Houghton Centre, Ontario, on Lake Erie

United Kingdom
 Sandhills, Oxfordshire
 Sandhills, Surrey
 Sandhills area of Southern Leighton Buzzard, UK
 Sandhills railway station in Liverpool, UK

United States
 Sand Hills (California), Yuba County, California
 Sandhills (Carolina), a region in North Carolina, South Carolina, and Georgia
Sand Hills cottage architecture
 Sand Hills (Florida), Bay County, Florida
 Sand Hills in Sheridan County, Montana
 Sandhills (Nebraska), a region in north-central Nebraska
 Sand Hills Golf Club, a country club in Mullen, Nebraska, within that state's Sandhills region
 Sandhills Publishing Company in Lincoln, Nebraska
 Sand Hills (Nevada), Washoe County, Nevada
 Sand Hills, Edison and Woodbridge, New Jersey
 Sand Hills, South Brunswick, New Jersey
 Sand Hills, Oklahoma
 Sand Hills (Oregon), Harney County, Oregon
 Monahans Sandhills State Park, Monahans, Texas
 Sand Hills (Utah), a set of hills in the Little Sahara Recreation Area